Where Hands Touch is a 2018 romantic war drama film directed and written by Amma Asante and starring Amandla Stenberg, George MacKay, Abbie Cornish, Christopher Eccleston, and Tom Sweet. It was produced by Charlie Hanson, and tells the story of Leyna (Stenberg), a biracial girl under threat because of her race, due to her living in Nazi Germany.

The film is a British Belgian Canadian and Irish co-production. Principal photography on the film began in November 2016 in Belgium and lasted for a month, wrapping up in December 2016.

Where Hands Touch premiered at the Toronto International Film Festival on 9 September 2018. It was released theatrically in the United States on 14 September 2018 by Vertical Entertainment. It received mixed reviews, with praise directed at Stenberg's performance, and criticism toward its screenplay.

Synopsis
The film is a rite-of-passage story of a biracial teenage girl falling in love with a member of the Hitler Youth and struggling for survival in Nazi Germany. The protagonist, Leyna, is portrayed as a German nationalist, and antisemite. Lutz is the son of a high ranking SS officer, and is initially an enthusiastic member of the Hitler Youth.

After Leyna and Lutz fall in love, she becomes pregnant. However, she gets sent to a Nazi labour camp where she must keep her pregnancy secret (as she is supposed to have been sterilized). Lutz is also stationed at the camp as an SS guard. After a bombing by the Americans, he attempts to escape with Leyna but he is killed by his father. Leyna, shocked, stays still on the ground until an American soldier comes to take her. Seven weeks later, she is heavily pregnant and she is in the displaced area where she reunites with her mother and brother.

Cast
 Amandla Stenberg as Leyna
 George MacKay as Lutz
 Abbie Cornish as Kerstin
 Christopher Eccleston as Heinz
 Tom Sweet as Koen

Production
Principal photography on the film began in November 2016 and wrapped up in December 2016 after shooting took place in Belgium (Werister coal mine) and the Isle of Man.

Release
On 20 May 2017, Sony Pictures Worldwide Acquisitions acquired the international distribution rights to the film, excluding select territories in Europe and Australia. It had its world premiere at the Toronto International Film Festival on 9 September 2018. It was released in the United States on 14 September 2018 by Vertical Entertainment.

Reception
The website's consensus reads, "Where Hands Touch is noteworthy for its exploration of a little-discussed corner of World War II, even if its story leaves something to be desired in the telling." On Metacritic the film has a score of 44% based on reviews from 13 critics, indicating "mixed or average reviews".

Glen Kenny of The New York Times criticized the film for "romanticization of Nazis".

See also
 List of black films of the 2010s
 Afro-Germans
 Rhineland Bastard
 Persecution of black people in Nazi Germany

References

External links
 
 

2018 films
2018 romantic drama films
2018 war drama films
British romantic drama films
British war drama films
Films about interracial romance
Films about Nazis
Films shot in Belgium
Films shot in the Isle of Man
2010s English-language films
2010s British films